Didrik Henbrant (born April 10, 1998) is a Swedish ice hockey player. He is currently playing with Karlskrona HK of the Swedish Hockey League (SHL).

Career
Born in Sturefors, Sweden, Henbrant played junior hockey with local team Linköpings HC. In 2012–13, he debuted at the under-16 level as a 15-year-old, playing fifteenth games in the J16 Elit. He also competed with a regional all-star team from Östergötland in the annual TV-pucken, an under-15 national tournament, in 2013 and 2014. The following season he dressed for 13 U-18 games, recording 5 goals. In 2013–14, Henbrant played 14 games with Linköpings HC's J20 SuperElit team. In 2016–17, Henbrant was promoted to Linköpings HC's senior team, where he made his Swedish Hockey League debut against HV71.

Career statistics

Regular season and playoffs

References

External links

1998 births
Living people
Linköping HC players
Swedish ice hockey forwards